Akimasa (written: 彰正, 顕正 or 明正) is a masculine Japanese given name. Notable people with the name include:

, Japanese astronomer
, Japanese footballer
, Japanese samurai and politician

Japanese masculine given names